Kansas's 3rd Senate district is one of 40 districts in the Kansas Senate. It has been represented by Democrat Tom Holland since 2009.

Geography
District 3 covers most of Douglas County outside of Lawrence and most of Leavenworth County outside of Leavenworth, including the communities of Eudora, Baldwin City, Basehor, Tonganoxie, and parts of Lansing and Lawrence proper.

The district is located entirely within Kansas's 2nd congressional district, and overlaps with the 10th, 38th, 40th, 42nd, 44th, 45th, 46th, and 54th districts of the Kansas House of Representatives. It borders the state of Missouri.

Recent election results

2020

2016

2012

Federal and statewide results in District 3

References

3
Douglas County, Kansas
Leavenworth County, Kansas